The Minister of National Defence of Burundi is the senior political appointee responsible for the National Defence Forces of Burundi.

In 2015 Maj General Pontien Gaciyubwenge was succeeded by a civilian.

List of ministers

The ministers have been:

References